Sharon Kay Miller (born January 31, 1941) is an American professional golfer who played on the LPGA Tour.

Miller was born in Marshall, Michigan. She attended Western Michigan University where she lettered in five sports; golf, tennis, field hockey, basketball, and volleyball. She was inducted into the WMU Hall of Fame in 1991.

Miller won twice on the LPGA Tour, in 1973 and 1974. She also won an unofficial event in 1968.

After retiring from the tour, Miller became a teaching professional.

Professional wins

LPGA Tour wins (2)

LPGA Tour playoff record (1–0)

Other wins
1968 Seven Lakes Invitational

References

External links

Profile on Bird Golf Academy site

American female golfers
LPGA Tour golfers
Golfers from Michigan
Western Michigan University alumni
People from Marshall, Michigan
1941 births
Living people
21st-century American women